The 2023 National Arena League season is scheduled to be the sixth season of the National Arena League (NAL). The league is scheduled to have seven teams play, all of which are located in the Eastern area of the United States of America. In July 2022, the league announced a expansion team that will play for this season, in which the team will play in Fayetteville, North Carolina as the Fayetteville Mustangs.

Teams 
As of January 2023, there are seven teams in the National Arena League.

Debut of Fayetteville Mustangs 

In the 2022 National Arena League season, the NAL stated that they planned to have a seventh team based in Fayetteville, North Carolina to join the league, and that they will have the team name and logo during the off season. In August 2022, the NAL announced that the new team will be named the Fayetteville Mustangs and that they will play this year.

Expansion of the West Texas Warbirds 
In August 2022, the NAL announced that they will add the West Texas Warbirds, a team that previously played in the Arena Football Association (AFA).

Removal of the Columbus Lions 
In December 2022, it was announced that the league had discontinued the membership of the Columbus Lions, which was a founding member of the NAL. The team will now play in the American Indoor Football Alliance (AIFA).

References

See also 
2023 Indoor Football League season

National Arena League seasons